Interference – Book Two: The Hour of the Geek is an original novel written by Lawrence Miles and based on the long-running British science fiction television series Doctor Who. It features the Eighth Doctor, the Third Doctor, Sam, Fitz and Sarah Jane and K-9.

The book also marks Sam's departure, the introduction of new companion Compassion, and culminates in an alternate regeneration for the Third Doctor.

See also

 Interference – Book One
 Faction Paradox

External links
The Cloister Library - Interference: Book Two

1999 British novels
1999 science fiction novels
Eighth Doctor Adventures
Third Doctor novels
Doctor Who multi-Doctor stories
Novels by Lawrence Miles
Faction Paradox